William Frank Clay (born April 28, 1944) is a former American football cornerback in the National Football League for the Washington Redskins.  He played college football at the University of Mississippi and was drafted in the fourth round of the 1966 NFL Draft.  Clay was also selected in the fifth round of the 1966 AFL Draft by the Denver Broncos.

References

1944 births
Living people
Players of American football from Mississippi
Sportspeople from Oxford, Mississippi
Ole Miss Rebels football players
American football cornerbacks
Washington Redskins players